North Carolina's 41st House district is one of 120 districts in the North Carolina House of Representatives. It has been represented by Democrat Maria Cervania since 2023.

Geography
Since 2005, the district has included part of Wake County. The district overlaps with the 15th and 16th Senate districts. Starting in 2023, the district will continue to include part of Wake County.

District officeholders since 1983

Multi-member district

Single-member district

Election results

2022

2020

2018

2016

2014

2012

2010

2008

2006

2004

2002

2000

References

North Carolina House districts
Wake County, North Carolina